Fussballclub St. Gallen 1879, commonly known as St. Gallen, is a Swiss professional football club based in the city of St. Gallen, Canton of St. Gallen. As of the 2022–23 season, the team competes in the Swiss Super League.

History

Founded on 19 April 1879, FC St. Gallen is the oldest club still in existence in Swiss football. However, the team has had relatively little success in comparison to other clubs. Despite the fact that St. Gallen won the Swiss championship twice in the 1903–04 and 1999–2000 seasons, the team has mostly been a mid-table side. During the last decade, the strength of the club continually declined and this eventually resulted in the transformation to a yo-yo club. St. Gallen were relegated to the second-tier Challenge League twice at the end of the 2007–08 and the 2010–11 seasons.

In 2016 FC St. Gallen, became a member of the exclusive Club of Pioneers, as the oldest football club of Switzerland.

Stadium
FC St. Gallen play their home games at the Kybunpark. The stadium has a capacity of 19,694 and it is on the west side of town. The stadium replaced the former Espenmoos stadium in the east.

Honours

Domestic

League
Swiss Super League
Winners: 1903–04, 1999–2000
Runners-up: 2019–20
Swiss Challenge League
Winners: 1970–71, 2008–09, 2011–12
Runners-up: 1967–68

Cup
Swiss Cup
Winners: 1968–69
Runners-up: 1944–45, 1976–77, 1997–98, 2020–21, 2021–22
Swiss League Cup
Winners: 1977–78
Runners-up: 1981–82

Others
Anglo Cup
Runners-up: 1910

European record

Overall record
Accurate as of 30 July 2018

Legend: GF = Goals For. GA = Goals Against. GD = Goal Difference.

Players

Current squad

Out on loan

Retired numbers

Club officials

Coaches

 Jack Reynolds (1912–14)
 William Townley (1920)
 Leopold Grundwald (1922)
 William Townley (1923–25)
 Jimmy Townley (1945–49)
 Robert Kelly (1949–51)
 Fritz Kerr (1952–54)
 Otto Pfister (1963–66)
 Virgil Popescu (1966–67)
 René Brodmann (1967–68)
 Albert Sing (1968–70)
 Željko Perušić (1970–74)
 Helmuth Johannsen (1 July 1981 – 30 June 1985)
 Werner Olk (1985–86)
 Uwe Klimaschefski (1 July 1986 – 1 March 1987)
 Kurt Jara (1 July 1988 – 1 October 1991)
 Uwe Rapolder (1 July 1993 – 10 April 1996)
 Werner Zünd (interim) (11 April 1996 – 25 April 1996)
 Roger Hegi (26 April 1996 – 31 December 1998)
 Marcel Koller (1 Jan 1999 – 31 December 2001)
 Gérard Castella (20 Feb 2002 – 15 September 2002)
 Thomas Staub (interim) (20 Sep 2002 – 9 December 2002)
 Heinz Peischl (1 March 2003 – 8 April 2005)
 Werner Zünd (interim) (29 April 2004 – 30 May 2005)
 René Weiler (interim) (13 April 2005 – 29 April 2005)
 Ralf Loose (1 July 2005 – 10 April 2006)
 Werner Zünd (interim) (10 April 2006 – 12 April 2006)
 Rolf Fringer (12 April 2006 – 8 October 2007)
 Krassimir Balakov (29 Oct 2007 – 30 June 2008)
 Uli Forte (1 July 2008 – 1 March 2011)
 Giorgio Contini /  Roger Zürcher (interim) (1 March 2011 – 7 March 2011)
 Jeff Saibene (7 March 2011 –2015)
 Josef Zinnbauer (16 September 2015 – 4 May 2017)
 Giorgio Contini (4 May 2017 – 1 April 2018)
 Peter Zeidler (18 June 2018–)

References

External links

 
Saint Gallen
Saint Gallen
1879 establishments in Switzerland